Darren Dale is an Indigenous Australian film and television producer. Since joining Blackfella Films as a producer in 2001, he is  co-director of the company, along with founder Rachel Perkins. Dale is known for co-producing many films and television series with Miranda Dear since 2010, with their most recent collaboration being the second season of Total Control.

Career
Dale joined Blackfella Films in 2000, and became co-director with company founder Rachel Perkins. The first stand-out success of this collaboration came with the production of First Australians, a 7-part documentary broadcast on SBS Television in 2008 and was the winner of multiple awards. It remains the highest-selling educational title in Australia, and was also sold overseas.

Dale has co-produced many films and television series with Miranda Dear, who joined Blackfella in 2010.

In 2011 he produced The Tall Man, a full-length documentary film directed by Tony Krawitz about the death in custody of Cameron Doomadgee on Great Palm Island in Queensland, which won several awards, including the Walkley Documentary Award. Other producing credits include First Contact (which won the 2015 Logie Award for Most Outstanding Factual Program), Filthy Rich & Homeless, DNA Nation, Deep Water: The Real Story and In My Own Words, directed by Erica Glynn.

In 2012 Dale and Dear produced the telemovie Mabo, a docudrama about the fight for land rights by Eddie Mabo, directed by Perkins.

In 2015 he co-created and executive produced the award-winning children's TV series Ready for This.

Dale produced Maralinga Tjarutja. a documentary about the people whose lives were disrupted by the British nuclear tests at Maralinga, created by Larissa Behrendt for the ABC in 2020.

Total Control, a drama series with the first season premiering at the Toronto International Film Festival in 2019, winner of the AACTA Award for Best TV Drama that year, was directed by Perkins and produced by Dale and Dear.

Other roles
Between 2002 and 2011, Dale and Perkins, as directors of Blackfella, curated and produced the Message Sticks Indigenous Film Festival, which was held at the Sydney Opera House before touring nationally. In 2012, Dale curated and presented Blackfella Films Presents, a selection of Indigenous films, in partnership with the Sydney, Melbourne and Brisbane International Film Festivals.

Dale served on the board of Screen NSW from 2011 to 2015, the Council of the Australian Film Television and Radio School (AFTRS) from 2012 to 2018 (from 2014 deputy chair).

 Dale serves on the board of the Sydney Film Festival,  ACMI, and the Sydney Festival.

Accolades
Dale has been awarded UNAA Media Peace Awards twice, in 2009 and 2010.

In 2011 Dale and Perkins, as directors of Blackfella Films, were ranked 16th in the Encore Power 50.

In 2012 he was awarded an honorary degree from AFTRS.

In July 2021 Dale, along with actor and filmmaker Wayne Blair and Australian producers Rosemary Blight and Kylie du Fresne, were invited to join the Academy of Motion Picture Arts and Sciences.

Many series and films produced by Dale have been nominated for awards, with wins including:
2008: First Australians (2008) won many awards, including AFI, AWGIE, Logie and Australian Directors' Guild Awards.
2011: Walkley Documentary Award, for The Tall Man (shared with Chloe Hooper and Tony Krawitz) 
2011: AWGIE Award for Best Broadcast Documentary, for The Tall Man
2014: AACTA Best Television Drama Series, for Redfern Now (with Miranda Dear)
2015: AACTA Best Children's Television Series, for Ready for This (with Miranda Dear and Joanna Werner)
2015: Logie Award for Most Outstanding Factual Program for First Contact
2020: Silver Award for Documentary (Human Rights) at the 2021 New York Festivals TV & Film Awards, for Maralinga Tjarutja

References

External links 
 

Australian television producers
Living people
Indigenous Australian filmmakers
Australian Broadcasting Corporation people
Year of birth missing (living people)
Date of birth missing (living people)
Place of birth missing (living people)